Karl Harold Phillip LeVander (October 10, 1910March 30, 1992) was an American attorney and politician. A Republican, he served as the 32nd governor of Minnesota from January 2, 1967 to January 4, 1971, after defeating incumbent governor Karl Rolvaag in the 1966 election.

Background
LeVander was born in Swedehome, Nebraska (near Stromsburg, Polk County) and attended high school in Watertown, Minnesota. His father, Peter Magni LeVander, was a Swedish immigrant and clergyman.

He graduated magna cum laude from Gustavus Adolphus College in 1932, where he served as class president and student council president. He was also on the debate team, winning the National Peace Oratorical Contest, and the football team and track team, where he competed in the high hurdles and pole vault. After graduating from Gustavus, he attended the University of Minnesota Law School. He married Iantha Powrie in 1938, and they raised a family of three children: Harold "Hap," Jean, and Diane LeVander.

Career
After graduation, LeVander worked as assistant county attorney for Dakota County from 1935 to 1939. He also worked for the law firm of Stassen & Ryan in South St. Paul, and taught speech and coached debate at Macalester College. He was active in local commerce, acting as president of South Saint Paul's Chamber of Commerce from 1952 to 1954 and of the South Saint Paul United Federal Savings and Loan Association from 1953 to 1967. He was politically connected, having worked with future governor Harold Stassen and future U.S. Representative Elmer Ryan at their law firm. In 1962, he earned the Greater Gustavus Alumni Award for Distinguished Career in Law.

LeVander took the governorship in 1967, and for the first time since 1953, the Republicans held the governorship and both houses of the state legislature. During his term the first Minnesota sales tax was created. He favored "initiative and referendum" and vetoed two bills that did not contain it. He also created the Metropolitan Council, the Minnesota Pollution Control Agency, and the inaugural Human Rights Department. During his term, the legislature ratified the Twenty-sixth Amendment, which lowered the minimum voting age nationwide to 18.

In a surprise move, LeVander declined to seek reelection in 1970, returning to his law practice and business interests, becoming a director of The St. Paul Companies (1973–1981), the Billy Graham Evangelistic Association (1974–1981), and the Saint Paul Chamber of Commerce (1975–1978). In 1992 he died from Parkinson's disease at the age of 81.

References

External links
Minnesota Historical Society
 "Harold LeVander." Alumni Files. Gustavus Adolphus College and Lutheran Church Archives.

1910 births
1992 deaths
People from Polk County, Nebraska
Gustavus Adolphus College alumni
University of Minnesota Law School alumni
Macalester College faculty
Republican Party governors of Minnesota
20th-century American lawyers
Minnesota lawyers
American Lutherans
American people of Swedish descent
20th-century American politicians
Neurological disease deaths in Minnesota
Deaths from Parkinson's disease